Juan Ramón Barrera Pérez (born 2 May 1989) is a Nicaraguan professional footballer who plays as a midfielder for Liga Primera club Real Estelí and the Nicaragua national team.

Club career
Nicknamed el Iluminado, he started his professional career at Real Estelí, then had a couple of seasons at Walter Ferretti. In summer 2011 he moved abroad to play for Panamanian outfit Tauro for whom he would play 8 league matches. In February 2012, he rejoined Estelí from Tauro.

In 2013, he became the second Nicaraguan footballer to play in a CONMEBOL First Division, when he was sent out on loan to Deportivo Petare of the Venezuelan Primera División for a six-month stint. He rejoined Estelí in summer 2013.

In early March it was announced that Barrera had signed with Austrian first division team SC Rheindorf Altach becoming the first Nicaraguan to play in Europe

Comunicaciones F.C
On December 23, 2015, Barrera joined Communicaciones F.C of the Guatemalan first division.

Barrera was a part of Comunicaciones F.C until December 1, 2017, in which he announced his farewell from the club through his social media. Barrera appeared 76 matches, scoring 9 goals.

Metropolitanos F.C

On January 15, 2018, Barrera announced his new club through social media to be Metropolitanos F.C of the Venezuelan first division. This marks his second stint in the Venezuelan first division, his first being with Deportivo Petare F.C in 2013.

He was a part of Metropolitanos F.C for approximately 5 months.

Boyacá Chicó F.C

On June 20, 2018, Barrera announced he signed with Boyacá Chicó F.C of the Colombian league first division.

On July 22, 2018, Barrera got his first start in a 2–2 draw when Boyacá Chicó F.C played their first match of the season against Millionarios F.C.

Barrera got his first win with the team on August 18, 2018, when Boyacá Chicó defeated Atlético Junior 2–1, with Barrera assisting the winning goal in the 87th minute of the game.

International career
Barrera made his debut for Nicaragua in a January 2009 UNCAF Nations Cup match against El Salvador and has, as of June 2021, earned a total of 62 caps, scoring 21 goals. He has represented his country in 12 FIFA World Cup qualification matches and played at the 2009 and 2011 UNCAF Nations Cups as well as at the 2009, 2017, and 2019 CONCACAF Gold Cups.

International goals
Scores and results list Nicaragua's goal tally first.

References

External links
 
 

1989 births
Living people
People from Nueva Segovia Department
Association football wingers
Nicaraguan men's footballers
Nicaraguan expatriate footballers
Nicaragua international footballers
2009 UNCAF Nations Cup players
2009 CONCACAF Gold Cup players
2011 Copa Centroamericana players
2014 Copa Centroamericana players
2017 Copa Centroamericana players
2017 CONCACAF Gold Cup players
Real Estelí F.C. players
C.D. Walter Ferretti players
Tauro F.C. players
Deportivo Miranda F.C. players
SC Rheindorf Altach players
Comunicaciones F.C. players
Metropolitanos FC players
Boyacá Chicó F.C. footballers
C.S.D. Municipal players
Venezuelan Primera División players
Austrian Football Bundesliga players
Austrian Regionalliga players
Liga Nacional de Fútbol de Guatemala players
Categoría Primera A players
2019 CONCACAF Gold Cup players
Expatriate footballers in Austria
Expatriate footballers in Guatemala
Expatriate footballers in Panama
Expatriate footballers in Venezuela
Expatriate footballers in Colombia
Nicaraguan expatriate sportspeople in Guatemala
Nicaraguan expatriate sportspeople in Panama